The blue jack mackerel (Trachurus picturatus) is a species of mackerel-like fish in the family Carangidae. Their maximum reported length is 60 cm, with a common length of 25 cm. They are coastal fish found at depths to 370 m off the Bay of Biscay to south Morocco and the western Mediterranean.

References

blue jack mackerel
Fish of the East Atlantic
Fish of the Mediterranean Sea
Marine fauna of North Africa
blue jack mackerel
blue jack mackerel